Owen Glyndwr Jenkins (8 April 1927 – 21 August 2014) was an Australian politician.

He was born in Mildura to soldier settler Frederick John Jenkins and Doris Lewis. He was educated at Red Cliffs and then at Condamine and Toowoomba in Queensland qualifying as an accountant. From 1945 to 1946 he was a sergeant in the Australian Imperial Force. After the war he worked as a chartered accountant in Geelong. From 1966 to 1971 he served on Geelong City Council. In 1970 he was elected to the Victorian Legislative Council for South Western, serving until 1976 when he transferred to Geelong; he was a member of the Liberal Party and served as whip from 1973 to 1979, parliamentary secretary to cabinet from 1979 to 1981, and Minister of Water Supply from 1981 to 1982. He lost his seat in 1982 and returned to chartered accountancy. Jenkins died in 2014 at Geelong.

References

1927 births
2014 deaths
Liberal Party of Australia members of the Parliament of Victoria
Members of the Victorian Legislative Council
People educated at Toowoomba State High School
Australian Army personnel of World War II
Australian Army soldiers